Jason Daniel Pearce (born 6 December 1987) is an English former professional footballer who played as a defender. He was previously the captain of Portsmouth, AFC Bournemouth, Leeds United and Charlton Athletic. He is currently U18s Academy Coach at Charlton Athletic.

Career

Portsmouth
Having joined Portsmouth as an apprentice in 2004, Pearce rose through the ranks. His professionalism despite his tender years earned him his first pro-contract in June 2006. After a spell on loan at Bognor Regis Town during the first half of the 2006–07 season, he joined Woking on a one-month loan in January 2007.

AFC Bournemouth
On 9 August 2007, Pearce joined AFC Bournemouth on a two-year contract. He helped get Bournemouth promoted to League One from League Two during the 2009–10 season. On 4 January 2010, Pearce replaced Danny Hollands as first team captain, in a new-look structure that saw veteran striker Steve Fletcher become club captain.

During the 2010–11 season, Pearce led the club to the League One playoffs, however his involvement in the playoffs saw him sent off in extra time for a foul on Kevin Kilbane in the semi final second leg against Huddersfield Town as Bournemouth were knocked out on penalties and as a result unable to gain a back to back promotion. Pearce received Bournemouth's Player of the Year Award for the 2010–11 season.

Return to Portsmouth
Pearce was sold back to his old club Portsmouth on a three-year contract for an undisclosed fee, reported to be in the region of £300,000, up to £600,000, on 24 June 2011. Pearce joined his new club alongside David Norris when the first team came back from absence on 1 July. After being suspended for the first three games of the season due to a red card in his last game for Bournemouth, Pearce made his debut on 16 August 2011, against Reading, playing as a centre-back. With Portsmouth in financial turmoil he was subject to a bid from Ipswich Town in January 2012, however he said he wanted to stay at Portsmouth under new manager Michael Appleton. When captain Liam Lawrence was loaned to Cardiff City, on 3 March 2012, Pearce was named as the new permanent captain of Portsmouth. He took over the captain's armband in the Championship match against Middlesbrough in a 3–1 loss which could have possibly been the club's last match in existence. This was too much for the 24-year-old captain who was reduced to tears at the end of the 90 minutes. At the end of the 2011–12 season, Portsmouth were relegated to League One, due to the financial problems at the club it was announced that Pearce would have to be sold to raise funds for the club. In April 2012, at the end of season awards, Pearce won seven out of the nine available supporters awards.

Leeds United
On 4 May 2012, Pearce signed for Leeds United for an undisclosed fee on a four-year contract, becoming the club's first signing of the summer transfer window. Leeds manager Neil Warnock revealed that he tried previously to sign him while he was at Queens Park Rangers and also tried sign him on loan in March, after he had joined Leeds. Following his transfer, Portsmouth administrator Trevor Birch defended the cut-price deal which saw him join Leeds as he explained that such measures are necessary to keep relegated Pompey afloat. Pearce made his competitive début for Leeds in the first game of the season against Shrewsbury Town in the League Cup on 11 August. Pearce made his league debut for Leeds their 1–0 victory against Wolverhampton Wanderers. He put in an impressive performance and received the man of the match award. With regular captain Lee Peltier out injured, Pearce was named captain for Leeds' 2–1 League Cup victory against Premiership side Everton on 25 September. Pearce also picked up a head injury in the same game which required stitches. Pearce received a straight red card against Watford on 10 November, the red card would result in a three-match ban. After his red card, Leeds signed Alan Tate to cover Pearce's absence, however due to Tate's form, Pearce lost his place in the side upon return from suspension. Following the arrival of Brian McDermott as manager and initially an injury to captain Lee Peltier. Pearce finished the season as the regular central defensive partner to Tom Lees.

He scored his first goal for the club on 5 October, in a 3–1 defeat against Derby County. Pearce was awarded the man of the match award against Queens Park Rangers on 1 March 2014 in a 1–1 draw, up to this point in the season, Pearce had played every single minute of the 2013/14 season for Leeds with a string of impressive individual performances. Pearce, missed the following game against Bolton Wanderers on 8 March as his partner gave birth to their first child on 7 March. On 3 May, At the club's annual awards ceremony, Pearce finished runner up to winner Ross McCormack in the Fans Player Of The Year award.

After the sale of club captain Ross McCormack, on 9 August 2014, Pearce was named as the new club Captain against Millwall. In November 2014, Pearce was replaced as captain by Stephen Warnock, with Warnock replaced as captain by Liam Cooper following his sale to Derby County in January 2015.

Wigan Athletic
On 30 January 2015, Pearce signed for Wigan Athletic for an undisclosed fee, reported to be £300,000, on a "long-term" contract.

Charlton Athletic
On 4 August 2016, Pearce joined League One club Charlton Athletic on an undisclosed fee. He scored his first goal for Charlton in a 3–0 win over Gillingham on 17 April 2017.

On 22 June 2021, Pearce extended his contract at the club for a further year.

On 10 May 2022, it was confirmed that Pearce would leave Charlton Athletic as a player when his contract expired. He was, however, offered a contract in a non-playing capacity. On 17 June 2022, it was confirmed that Pearce had retired and taken up the role of U18s Academy Coach.

Career statistics

Honours
Wigan Athletic 
League One: 2015–16
Charlton Athletic
League One play-offs: 2018–19

Individual
AFC Bournemouth Player of the Year: 2010–11
Portsmouth Player of the Year: 2011–12

References

External links

1987 births
Living people
Footballers from Hillingdon
English footballers
Association football defenders
Portsmouth F.C. players
Bognor Regis Town F.C. players
Woking F.C. players
AFC Bournemouth players
Leeds United F.C. players
Wigan Athletic F.C. players
Charlton Athletic F.C. players
English Football League players
National League (English football) players
Charlton Athletic F.C. non-playing staff